Michael J. Flynn (March 15, 1872 – June 16, 1941) was a Major League Baseball catcher, at least for one day, during the 1891 season.  He was born in County Kildare, Ireland.

He played in one game for the Boston Reds of the American Association, on August 31, 1891.  Behind the plate, he handled six chances flawlessly for a fielding percentage of 1.000.  At the plate, he went 0-for-2 for a .000 batting average.  The game with the Louisville Colonels ended in a 2-2 tie.  It was played at the Congress Street Grounds in Boston, Massachusetts.

Flynn, a 19-year-old, was the sixth-youngest player to appear in an A.A. game that season.

See also
List of players from Ireland in Major League Baseball

External links

Retrosheet

Boston Reds (AA) players
Major League Baseball catchers
Major League Baseball players from Ireland
Irish baseball players
Sportspeople from County Kildare
19th-century baseball players
1872 births
1941 deaths
Portland (minor league baseball) players
Brockton Shoemakers players
Augusta Kennebecs players
Lewiston (minor league baseball) players
Irish emigrants to the United States (before 1923)